This is a list of Danish football transfers for the 2008 summer transfer window. Only moves featuring at least one Danish Superliga club are listed.

The 2007–08 Danish Superliga season ended on May 24, 2008, with the 2008–09 Danish Superliga season starting on July 19, 2008. The summer transfer window opened on 1 July 2008, although a few transfers took place prior to that date; including carry-overs from the winter 2007–08 transfer window. The window closed at midnight on 31 August 2008. Players without a club may join one at any time, either during or in between transfer windows. If need be, clubs may sign a goalkeeper on an emergency loan, if all others are unavailable.

Transfers

Notes
 Player will officially join his new club on 1 July 2008.
 Player will officially join his new club on 7 July 2008.
 Player will officially join his new club on 23 July 2008.
 Player will officially join his new club on 24 July 2008.
 Player will officially join his new club on 1 August 2008.

References

Danish
2008
2007–08 in Danish football
2008–09 in Danish football